The Thyagaraj Sport Complex is a sports stadium in New Delhi, India. It was designed by leading architects PTM of Australia and Kapoor & Associates of Delhi. The venue was built for the 2010 Commonwealth Games, and was named after the Telugu composer Tyagaraja.

History 
Thyagaraj Sports Complex is built especially for Delhi 2010's Netball competition. Inaugurated on 2 April 2010 by Mrs. Sheila Dikshit, Chief Minister of Delhi, the Stadium is India's first Netball stadium named after the 18th century south Indian poet-composer Thyagaraj (4 May 1767 – 6 January 1847).

Construction 
Landscaping is being done with an emphasis on native species and a reduction in soil toxicity.

Features 
It is India's first-ever model Green Venue built with the latest green building technologies. The stadium has an R.C.C. structure with steel roofing, and the flooring work has been done using granite, recycled PVC, carpets, epoxy, and Kota stone. The stadium has maple wood flooring in the central arena.                                             The Thyagaraj Stadium will be setting a benchmark in terms of power efficiency. Lighting will be provided using solar energy. In addition, building-integrated photovoltaic cells will allow the stadium to feed electricity to the grid. The Complex is also equipped with  Dual Fuel Gas Turbine to feed emergency electricity at Stadium. This Sport Complex is awarded Gold rating by Indian Green Building Council for its Green Features

Events 
The Thyagaraj Stadium was a venue for netball during the 2010 Commonwealth Games, which was contested from 4–14 October 2010. Now, the stadium houses the education department of the Government of Delhi. The 4th annual comic-con India took place here between 7–9 February 2014. The stadium is the home ground of Dabang Delhi in the Pro Kabaddi League and has also hosted the India Open table tennis tournament in 2017. The stadium was also the official venue of PUBG MOBILE CLUB OPENS in 2019. Athletic ground of the sports complex is sometimes used by local club Hindustan FC for matches of Delhi Football League.

See also
Jawaharlal Nehru Stadium, Delhi

References

Sports venues in Delhi
2010 Commonwealth Games venues
Indoor arenas in India
Kabaddi venues in India
2010 establishments in Delhi
Sports venues completed in 2010
Netball venues